Lyudmila Mikhailovna Pavlichenko, ((romanized: Lyudmyla Mykhailivna Pavlychenko), ; 10 October 1974) was a Soviet sniper in the Red Army during World War II.

She claimed to have killed 309 soldiers. However, many feats attributed to her have been called into question by various historians analyzing her contradictory claims and timeline of events. She served in the Red Army during the siege of Odessa and the siege of Sevastopol, during the early stages of the fighting on the Eastern Front.

After she was injured in battle by a mortar shell, she was evacuated to Moscow. After she recovered from her injuries, she trained other Red Army snipers and was a public spokeswoman for the Red Army. In 1942, she toured the United States, Canada, and the United Kingdom. After the war ended in 1945, she was reassigned as a senior researcher for the Soviet Navy. She died of a stroke at the age of 58.

Early life and education 

The family moved to Kyiv when Lyudmila was aged 14.
As a child, Lyudmila was a self-described tomboy, who was fiercely competitive at athletic activities. In Kyiv, she joined an OSOAVIAKhIM shooting club, developed into an amateur sharpshooter and earned her Voroshilov Sharpshooter badge and a marksman certificate.

In 1932, she married Alexei Pavlichenko, and gave birth to a son, Rostislav (1932–2007). However, the marriage was soon dissolved, and Lyudmila returned to live with her parents.
She attended night school as well as performing household chores. During the day, she worked as a grinder at the Kyiv Arsenal factory.

She enrolled at Kyiv University in 1937, where she studied history and intended to be a scholar and teacher. There, she competed on the university's track team as a sprinter and pole vaulter. She was also enrolled in a military-style sniping school for six months by the Red Army.

World War II 

In June 1941, Pavlichenko was aged 25 in her fourth year studying history at Kyiv University when Nazi Germany began its invasion of the Soviet Union. Pavlichenko was among the first round of volunteers at the Odesa recruiting office, where she requested to join the infantry. The registrar pushed Pavlichenko to be a nurse, but she refused. After seeing that she had completed multiple training courses, she was finally accepted into the army as a sniper and assigned to the Red Army's 25th Rifle Division.  There, she became one of 2,000 female snipers in the Red Army, of whom about 500 survived the war. Although she was assigned a combat role, she was issued with just a fragmentation grenade because of weapons shortages. On 8 August 1941, a fallen comrade handed her his Mosin–Nagant model 1891 bolt-action rifle. Pavlichenko then shot her first two enemies and proved herself to her comrades. She described the event as her "baptism of fire" because that was when she officially became a sniper.

Pavlichenko fought for about  months during the siege of Odesa and is credited with killing 187 soldiers. She was promoted to senior sergeant in August 1941, when she added 100 more kills to her official tally. At 25, she married a fellow sniper, Alexei Kitsenko. Soon after the marriage, Kitsenko was mortally wounded by a mortar shell and died from his injuries a few days later in the hospital.

When the Nazis and their Romanian allies overran Odesa on 15 October 1941, her unit was withdrawn by sea to Sevastopol, on the Crimean Peninsula, to fight in the siege of Sevastopol. There, she trained other snipers, who were credited with killing over 100 Axis soldiers during the battle. In May 1942, newly promoted Lieutenant Pavlichenko was cited by the Southern Army Council for killing 257 Axis soldiers. The number of soldiers Pavlichenko is credited with killing during World War II was 309, including 36 Axis snipers.

In June 1942, Pavlichenko was hit in the face with shrapnel from a mortar shell. When she was injured, the Soviet High Command ordered for her to be evacuated from Sevastopol via submarine.

She spent around a month in the hospital. Once she had recovered from her injuries, instead of being sent back to the front, she became a propagandist for the Red Army, where she was nicknamed "Lady Death." She also trained snipers for combat duty until the end of the war in 1945.

Visits to Allied countries 

In 1942, Pavlichenko was sent to Canada and the United States for a publicity visit as part of the Soviet Union's attempts to convince the other Allies of World War II to open a second front against Nazi Germany. When she visited the United States, she became the first Soviet citizen to be received by a US president, as Franklin D. Roosevelt welcomed her to the White House. Pavlichenko was later invited by First Lady Eleanor Roosevelt to tour the US, relating her experiences as a female soldier on the front lines. During the publicity tour, Pavlichenko was not taken seriously by the press and was referred to as the "Girl Sniper." When meeting with reporters in Washington, DC, she was dumbfounded by the kind of questions put to her. "One reporter even criticized the length of the skirt of my uniform, saying that in America women wear shorter skirts and besides my uniform made me look fat." They also asked if she used makeup on the front line. She was described by the reporters as very blunt and unemotional in her responses.

Pavlichenko appeared before the International Student Assembly being held in Washington, DC, attended the meetings of the Congress of Industrial Organizations, and made appearances and speeches in New York City and Chicago. In New York City, she was given a raccoon fur coat by Mayor Fiorello H. La Guardia. In Chicago, she stood before large crowds, chiding the men to support a second front. "Gentlemen," she said, "I am 26 years old and I have killed 309 fascist invaders by now. Don't you think, gentlemen, that you have been hiding behind my back for too long?" Her words settled on the crowd, then caused a surging roar of support. The United States government presented her with a Colt semi-automatic pistol. In Toronto, Ontario, she was presented a Winchester Model 70 rifle equipped with a Weaver telescopic sight, now on display at the Central Armed Forces Museum in Moscow. While visiting Canada, along with fellow sniper Vladimir Pchelintsev and Moscow fuel commissioner Nikolai Kravchenko, she was greeted by thousands of people at Toronto's Union Station.

On Friday 21 November 1942, Pavlichenko visited Coventry, England, accepting donations of £4,516 from local workers to pay for three X-ray units for the Red Army. She also visited the ruins of Coventry Cathedral, then the Alfred Herbert works and Standard Motor Factory, from where most funds had been raised. She had inspected a factory in Birmingham earlier in the day.

Having been made an officer, Pavlichenko never returned to combat, instead becoming an instructor and training snipers until the war's end. In 1943, she was awarded the Gold Star of the Hero of the Soviet Union, as well as the Order of Lenin twice.

Later life 

When the war ended, Pavlichenko finished her education at Kyiv University and began a career as a historian. From 1945 to 1953, she was a research assistant at Soviet Navy headquarters. She was later active in the Soviet Committee of the Veterans of War. In 1957, Eleanor Roosevelt visited Pavlichenko in Moscow during a visit to the Soviet Union. Pavlichenko struggled constantly with depression because of the loss of her husband in the war. She also suffered from post-traumatic stress disorder and alcoholism, factors that are believed to have contributed to her early death.

Death and legacy 

She died from a stroke on 10 October 1974 at 58 and was buried in Novodevichy Cemetery in Moscow. Her son, Rostislav, is buried next to her.

A second Soviet commemorative stamp featuring her portrait was issued in 1976.

In popular culture 

The American folk singer Woody Guthrie composed a song ("Miss Pavlichenko") as a tribute to her war record and to memorialize her visits to the United States and Canada. It was released as part of The Asch Recordings.

Pavlichenko was a subject of the 2015 film, Battle for Sevastopol (original Russian title, "Битва за Севастополь"). A joint Russian-Ukrainian production, it was released in both countries on 2 April 2015. Its international premiere took place two weeks later at the Beijing International Film Festival. It is a heavily romanticized version of her life, with several fictitious characters and many departures from the events related in her memoirs.

The first English language edition of her memoirs, Lady Death, was published by Greenhill Books in February 2018. It has a foreword by Martin Pegler and is part of the Lionel Leventhal's Greenhill Sniper Library series.

Pavlichenko's story was featured in the fourth season of Drunk History, where she was played by Mae Whitman.

In Call of Duty: Vanguard, protagonist Lt. Polina Petrova (voiced by Laura Bailey) was inspired by Pavlichenko.

In the 1995 alternate history novel Worldwar: Tilting the Balance by Harry Turtledove, Pavlichenko seems to have been the inspiration for the minor character Tatiana in Pskov.

In the 1944 film comedy, The Doughgirls, Eve Arden played Sgt. Natalia Moskoroff, a highly-decorated Soviet sniper visiting the capital on a good-will tour.

Kate Quinn's 2022 novel The Diamond Eye is a fictionalized account of Pavlichenko's life.

Awards and honours 

 Hero of the Soviet Union (25 October 1943)
 Two Orders of Lenin (16 July 1942 and 25 October 1943)
 Two Medals "For Military Merit" (26 April 1942 and 13 June 1952)
 Campaign medals

See also 

 List of female Heroes of the Soviet Union
 Roza Shanina – World War II female sniper credited with 59 confirmed kills
 Lydia Litvyak – World War II female flying ace
 Snipers of the Soviet Union
 Mosin–Nagant

Notes

References

Bibliography

External links 

 Lyudmila Pavlichenko about snipers during the Great Patriotic War. Documentary filmed by the Soviet Central Television in 1973 and released in 1975
 

1916 births
1974 deaths
Burials at Novodevichy Cemetery
Heroes of the Soviet Union
People from Bila Tserkva
Soviet military snipers
Soviet historians
Soviet military personnel of World War II
Soviet people of Russian descent
Sniper warfare
Recipients of the Order of Lenin
Military personnel from Kyiv
Military personnel from Bila Tserkva
Ukrainian women in World War II
Ukrainian military snipers
Ukrainian Soviet Socialist Republic people